Louise Lecavalier OC (born October 3, 1958) is a Canadian dancer known as one of the icons of Canadian contemporary dance.

Biography 
Lecavalier was born and raised in Montreal, Quebec. She began her professional dance career at the age of eighteen when she joined Le Groupe Nouvelle Aire. It was there that she met Édouard Lock.

Lecavalier became Lock's main character and inspiration in his company La La La Human Steps. With her mane of platinum dreadlocks, her physical power and her mastery of the full-body barrel jump – a gravity-defying, fully horizontal, mid-air barrel roll – her image was a signature for the company. She was the embodiment of Lock's frenetic and technically challenging androgynous aesthetic in works such as Human Sex (1985) and Infante, c'est destroy (1991).

She joined La La La Human Steps in 1981 for its production of Oranges and went on to perform in each of the company's productions up until Salt in 1998.

In 1985, Lecavalier became the first Canadian to win a Bessie Award in New York for her performance in Businessman in the Process of Becoming an Angel (1983). The London Times critic found Lock's "extravagant" play poor but stated that there were

"...two women who seemed quite skilled at performing various odd dance steps; the fair-haired one [Louise Lecavalier] had a pleasing bravado whenever the production gave her half a chance."

She danced in Human Sex (1985), New Demons (1987), Infante, c'est destroy (1991) and finally, 2 (1995) and Salt (1998).

Lecavalier also participated in each of La La La's major collaborations, including David Bowie's Sound+Vision Tour in 1990 and Fame '90 music video, The Yellow Shark concerts, performed by Frank Zappa and Germany's Ensemble Modern in Frankfurt, Berlin, and Vienna in 1992, and the film Inspirations from director Michael Apted in 1996.

In May 1999, Lecavalier received the Jean A. Chalmers National Award, Canada's most distinguished dance prize.

In 2003, she appeared with Tedd Robinson in Lula and the Sailor as part of a concert of duets choreographed by Robinson. In the winter of 2005, she co-produced Cobalt Rouge with the National Arts Centre in Ottawa, the Biennale di Venezia and Théâtre de la Ville in Paris. The work features Lecavalier with dancers Marc Boivin, Masaharu Imazu, and Tedd Robinson, and musician/composer Yannick Rieu.

Lecavalier has been a guest teacher at New York University on several occasions and continues to perform as an independent artist.

In 2008, she was made an Officer of the Order of Canada.

On April 7, 2010, she was awarded the Order of Canada. On December 7, 2012, her piece "So Blue" premiered in Düsseldorf. It was her first dance choreography. In May 2014, Lecavalier received the Governor General's Performing Arts Award for Lifetime Artistic Achievement in dance. The award is Canada's highest honour in the performing arts.

Notable performances 

 Oranges (1981)
 Businessman in the Process of Becoming an Angel (1983)
 Human Sex (1985)
 New Demons (1987)
 Infante, C'est destroy (1991)
 2 (1995)
 Salt (1998)
 Lula and the Sailor
 Cobalt Rouge (2005)
 Children (2010) L.L. / Fou Glorieux
 So Blue (2012) L.L. / Fou Glorieux

Movies and videos 

 1982 The Mondo Beyondo Show (TV)
 1989 Carole Laure's "Danse avant de tomber" as Dancer
 1990 David Bowie's "Fame '90" music video as Dancer
 1992 The Yellow Shark by Frank Zappa (TV)
 1994 Velasquez's Little Museum as Dancer
 1995 Pour tout dire as Module 3
 1995 Pour tout dire as Module 4
 1995 Strange Days as Cindy 'Vita' Minh
 1997 Inspirations as Herself

See also 
 La La La Human Steps

References

External links 
 
 
 Lecavalier and Bowie performing in the iconic music video
 Archival footage of Louise Lecavalier performing A Few Minutes of Lock in 2011 at Jacob's Pillow.

 

1958 births
Canadian contemporary dancers
Canadian female dancers
French Quebecers
Governor General's Performing Arts Award winners
Living people
Officers of the Order of Canada
People from Montreal